is a Japanese football player. He plays for Saurcos Fukui.

Playing career
Masato Hashimoto joined to J1 League club; Urawa Red Diamonds in 2008. From 2010, he played Tochigi SC (2010), V-Varen Nagasaki (2011), SC Sagamihara (2012-2013) and Grulla Morioka (2014-2015). Currently he played for Saurcos Fukui from 2016.

References

External links

1989 births
Living people
Association football people from Chiba Prefecture
Japanese footballers
J1 League players
J2 League players
J3 League players
Japan Football League players
Urawa Red Diamonds players
Tochigi SC players
V-Varen Nagasaki players
SC Sagamihara players
Iwate Grulla Morioka players
Association football defenders